Gephyroberyx japonicus, the big roughy or blueberry roughy, is a species of fish in the family Trachichthyidae. It can reach  in length. Based on broadly overlapping morphological features it is sometimes (e.g., by IUCN) considered a synonym of G. darwinii.

It is sometimes seen in deep-sea exhibits in public aquariums and it has spawned in captivity.

References

External links
 
 

Trachichthyidae
Fish described in 1883